is a 1998 Japanese film directed by Hideyuki Hirayama. It was Japan's submission to the 71st Academy Awards for the Academy Award for Best Foreign Language Film, but was not accepted as a nominee. It was chosen as Best Film at the Japan Academy Prize ceremony.

Cast
 Mieko Harada: Terue Yamaoka
 Maho Nonami: Migusa Yamaoka
 Fumiyo Kohinata
 Mami Kumagai
 Jun Kunimura: Saburo Wachi
 Naomi Nishida
 Tsuyoshi Ujiki: Takenori Wachi
 Yuji Nakamura
 Moro Morooka
 Kiichi Nakai: Fumio Chin
 Ai Koinuma: Terue Yamaoka, aged 5

2017 Television Drama remake
A television special drama (tanpatsu) remake, starring Ryoko Shinohara, Alice Hirose, Takaya Kamikawa and Rio Suzuki was broadcast on NTV on 11 January 2017.

See also
Cinema of Japan
List of submissions to the 71st Academy Awards for Best Foreign Language Film
List of Japanese submissions for the Academy Award for Best Foreign Language Film

References

External links
 
 
 
 
 
 

1998 films
Films directed by Hideyuki Hirayama
1990s Japanese-language films
Picture of the Year Japan Academy Prize winners
1990s Japanese films